The slender sculpin (Cottus tenuis) is a species of freshwater ray-finned fish belonging to the family Cottidae, the typical sculpins. It is endemic to the United States, occurring only in the upper Klamath Lake river drainage in Oregon. It is found along lake shores over mud, sand and gravel, and in the riffles, runs and pools of streams and rivers. It reaches a maximum length of 9 cm.

Sources 

Freshwater fish of the United States
Cottus (fish)
Fish described in 1898
Taxonomy articles created by Polbot
Taxa named by Barton Warren Evermann
Taxa named by Seth Eugene Meek